Hossack is a surname. Notable people with the surname include:

Allison Hossack, Canadian actress
Anthony Hossack, English footballer
Darren Hossack, Australian race car driver
Graeme Hossack, Canadian lacrosse player
John Hossack, Scottish-American abolitionist
Michael Hossack, American musician
Norman Hossack, motor sport racing and electronics engineer

See also
Hossack River, river in New Zealand
John Hossack House, historic house in Illinois
William Hossak, Canadian politician